Svend Jakobsen (1935–2022) was a Danish politician who held different cabinet posts between 1973 and 1981. He was the speaker of the Danish Parliament or Folketing from 1981 to 1989.

Biography
Jakobsen was born in Vendsyssel on 1 November 1935. He was the seventh of his parents' nine children. He attended a secondary school, but did not complete his studies. He worked as a commission agent from 1955 to 1959. He joined the Social Democrats and was elected to the Folketing in 1971 from the constituency of Copenhagen county. He was a member of the cabinets led by Anker Jørgensen and served as minister of housing (September–November 1973), minister of taxes (1975–1977), minister of fisheries (1977–1979) and minister of finance (1979–1981). In 1981 Jakobsen was elected as the speaker of the Folketing and remained in office until 1989.

Following his retirement from politics in 1989 Jakobsen was the president of Denmark's Savings Association between 1990 and 1994. He was president of the Norwegian Cancer Society (1993–2001) and chairman of the Vocational Training Council (1994–2000). He was also chairman of the board of Arken Museum of Modern Art (1997–2007) and chairman of the board of the Foundation for Danish-Norwegian Cooperation.

Jakobsen was married and had two daughters. He lived in a senior housing in Taastrup and died there on 28 May 2022.

References

1935 births
2022 deaths
Danish Finance Ministers
Danish Tax Ministers
Fisheries ministers of Denmark
Members of the Folketing 1971–1973
Members of the Folketing 1973–1975
Members of the Folketing 1975–1977
Members of the Folketing 1977–1979
Members of the Folketing 1979–1981
Members of the Folketing 1981–1984
Members of the Folketing 1984–1987
Members of the Folketing 1987–1988
People from the North Jutland Region
Social Democrats (Denmark) politicians
Speakers of the Folketing